Del Mar Academy is an independent, nonsectarian, co-educational day school with a culturally and economically diverse student population. At present, Del Mar serves families with children as young as 18 months and up to 11th grade. It is a bilingual school.

The school is located in Nosara, Costa Rica and offers the Montessori philosophy in the early years programs and IB during the diploma years.

References

External links

Schools in Costa Rica